The 1985 Australian Professional Championship was a professional non-ranking snooker tournament, which took place between 2 and 11 August 1985 at the Orange RSL Club in Sydney, Australia.

John Campbell won the tournament defeating Eddie Charlton 10–7 in the final.

Main draw

References

Australian Professional Championship
Australian Professional Championship
Australian Professional Championship
Australian Professional Championship